Henry Plée (also named H.D. Plée, Henri Plée, Henry D. Plée, or Henry-Désiré Plée, 24 May 1923; Arras, Nord-Pas-de-Calais–19 August 2014; Paris) was a French martial artist who is considered as the 'father of European and French karate'. He was one of the rare 10th dan karate masters living outside Japan, and one of the few Westerners who held this rank. At the time of his death, Plée was also the oldest and highest karate ranking Westerner alive, with more than 60 years of fighting arts, including 50 in martial arts. He was a pioneer in introducing karate to France and Europe, and has taught most of today's highest ranking karate masters in Europe.

Background
Henry Plée was born in Arras, Nord-Pas-de-Calais, France on 24 May 1923. His studies were interrupted by World War II in 1940.

An only son, Henry Plée started his sports career with gymnastics, weight lifting, French savate, English Boxing, Greco-Roman wrestling, Ju Jutsu, and fencing with his father Alcide Plée, who was a sword master since 1912. He diversified into judo in 1945 at the 'Judo Club de France', Mikonosuke Kawaishi's second club. He was the 96th French black belt and is now ranked 5th dan at judo.

Physically, he demonstrated very powerful kicks and punches. So from 1946, he returned to French savate, also known as French kickboxing, at the  club 'Banville' (the only remaining club at that time). He trained with famous fighters such as Rigal, Pierre Plasait, Cayron, and Pierre Baruzy. Despite the high training quality, he was still feeling the need to go stronger and deeper, and was still looking for something else.

He discovered aikido with Minoru Mochizuki, then karate from an article in Life magazine with Fukuda Rikutaro, his Judo Kodokan magazine's translator. Fukuda Rikutaro confided in him that he learnt karate in Tokyo with Gichin Funakoshi. This was the start of his karate career in 1953, with help from Donn Draeger in Japan.

Karate

In 1955 he founded his dojo: the Karate Club de France (KCF), which became Académie française des Arts Martiaux (AFAM), which became 'Shobudo', also known as 'The Mountain/ La Montagne' (in French) or as 'Dojo de la Montagne Sainte-Geneviève' in Paris. It is the oldest karate dojo in Europe, which has won 32 French, Europe, and world championships since its creation.

Here he taught the four pillars of Japanese martial arts: karate, judo, aikido, and kendo. Plée instructed many black belts who, at a later stage, became the foundation of the European karate institutions, and are today some of the highest ranking karate masters in Europe.

He frequently traveled to Japan. There he met with and learnt from some of the most famous karate masters of all styles. 
He invited many of them to visit him in France. He even financed the visit to France of many Japanese and Chinese martial arts experts. They taught at the Shobudo, where the secrets of karate were being unveiled to Europe.

In 1956, he founded the 'French Federation of Karate and Boxing' (Fédération Française de Karaté et de Boxe Libre), which became part of the 'French Federation of Judo and Associated Disciplines' (Fédération française de Judo et Disciplines Associées - FFJDA) in 1960. Under his influence, the creation in 1966 of the 'European Union of Karate' (Union Européenne de Karaté), showed an independence of karate from the judo federations, and the decision of not favoring any karate style over another. He also served as a Technical Advisor to the 'European Karate Federation (EKF)', and as its General Secretary in 1967.

For 21 years (1950–1971) he financed and published the first bilingual (French/ English) karate magazine named Budo Magazine Europe. He also published another magazine named Judo Kodokan, which was a translation of the Japanese magazine of the Tokyo Kodokan. He wrote books, and appeared in the movie La Vie, l'amour, la mort.

He owns at 'The Mountain' the most comprehensive private Martial Arts library available in Europe. Also located there is his Martial Arts store named 'Budostore', which offers equipments, books, videos, and DVDs. Henry Plée heads a very exclusive European think-tank on Martial Arts, which studies the essence and spirituality of Martial Arts, and he regularly publishes his chronicles on-line.

From 200 karate practitioners in 1961, Henry Plée's efforts have led today to more than 200,000 practitioners in France. The French government considers him as one of the greatest international experts in Martial Arts, and has knighted Plée with the French Ordre national du Mérite in 2008.

Ranks
Since the 1950s, numerous trips to Japan allowed him to meet some of the most famous karate masters of all styles, and to pass belts in various styles and disciplines:

Karate
 10th dan, Hanshi Karate in Japan, by Tsuneyoshi Ogura in 1987.
 9th dan, Hanshi Karate in Japan, by Tsuneyoshi Ogura in 1984.
 8th dan, Shihan Karate in Japan, by Tsuneyoshi Ogura in 1972, and in France by the Fédération Française de Karaté - FFKAMA in 1975.
 5th dan, Renshi Karate in Japan, by Chojiro Tani.
 1st, 2nd, 3rd dan, karate in France, by Minoru Mochizuki.

Judo
 5th dan, Judo.
 The 96th French black belt.

Aikido
 3rd dan, Aikido, by Masamichi Noro.
 2nd dan, Aikikai Hombu Aikido, by Tadashi Abe.
 1st dan, Yoseikan Aikido, by Minoru Mochizuki.

Kendo
 1st dan, Kendo, by Minoru Mochizuki.

Bōjutsu
 1st dan, Bo-Jutsu, by Minoru Mochizuki.

Awards
Henry Plée has been granted the following awards:
 'Katana of Honour' at the 25th 'Martial Art Festival of Bercy', on 27 March 2010.
 Knight of Ordre national du Mérite, on 12 December 2008.
 Nominated 'Ambassador Martial Art' by 'Hall of Fame Kyusho international' in 2006, 'Ambassador for peace', and then 'Sensei of the century' in 2000.
 'Professor of the Century' at the 14th 'Martial Art Festival of Bercy' in 1999.
 Golden medal of 'French ministry for Youth and Sports' (Ministère de la Santé et des Sports - France).
 President of Honor of the 'French Federation of Karate and Associated Martial Arts' (Fédération française de karaté et disciplines associées - FFKAMA).
 President of Honor of the 'Karate European Union' (Union Européenne de Karaté - UEK).
 President of Honor of the 'French Federation of Judo and Associated Disciplines' (Fédération française de Judo et Disciplines Associées - FFJDA).
 Member of the 'Honorary Board of the International Fund for Preservation of Martial Arts' (Fonds International pour la Préservation des Arts Martiaux - FIPAM).

Teachers 

Henry Plée has traveled frequently to Japan in order to learn and meet with the most famous karate masters of all styles such as Gichin Funakoshi and many others. Along the years, he financed the visits to France of more than 17 Japanese and Chinese martial arts experts, including:

 Hiroo Mochizuki, 9th dan in Karate (FFKDA), 8th dan in Aikido, 8th dan in Jujitsu, 3rd dan in Judo, 7th dan in Iaido and Kobudo. Founder, Sōke, and Hanshi of Yoseikan Budo. 2nd dan in Shotokan karate in 1957 (Born 1936)
 Tetsuji Murakami, 3rd dan in Shotokan karate in 1958, 2nd dan in Kendo, 1st dan in Aikido, and 1st dan in Iaido (1927–1987)
 Tsutomu Oshima, 3rd dan in Shotokan karate in 1959
 Yoshinao Nanbu, 9th dan in Karate (FFKDA). Founder and Doshu-Sōke of Nanbudō in 1978 and of the Worldwide Nanbudo Federation-WNF. 2nd dan in Karate in 1964, Japan champion in 1962 (Born 1943)
 Taiji Kase, 9th dan in Karate in 2004. 5th dan in Shotokan karate in 1967 (1929–2004)
 Hiroshi Shirai, 9th dan in Karate in 1999. 5th dan in Shotokan karate at the time
 Keinosuke Enoeda, 9th dan in Karate (JKA). 2nd dan in Karate at the time
 Mitsusuke Harada, 4th dan in Shotokai karate, and student of Shigeru Egami
 Tadashi Abe
 Tsuneyoshi Ogura, 10th dan in Goju Ryu karate

Inviting many Japanese masters to France allowed him to learn in continuity from his actual level, instead of starting from the beginning in every school in Japan. It also molded French karate with a unique blend of not favoring any karate style over another.

Students 

Henry Plée instructed many black belts who became the foundation of the European karate institutions, and are today some of the highest ranking karate masters in Europe, including:

 Jean Pierre Lavorato, 9th dan karate
 Dominique Valera, 9th dan karate and 9th degree full-contact karate, world champion karate in 1972
 Roland Habersetzer, 9th dan karate, author of many books on karate
 Guy Sauvin, 8th dan karate, world champion karate in 1972, and founder of the Sei Do Jyuku style
 Alain Setrouck, 8th dan Kyokushinkai karate, world champion karate in 1972
 Francis Didier, 7th dan karate, President of the 'French Federation of Karate and Associated Martial Arts' (Fédération française de karaté et disciplines associées - FFKDA)
 François Petitdemange, 6th dan karate, world champion karate in 1972
 Jacques Delcourt, 4th dan karate, President and founder of the 'French Federation of Karate and Associated Martial Arts' (Fédération française de karaté et disciplines associées - FFKDA) for 23 years, President and founder of the European Karate Federation, and President and founder of the World Karate Federation.
 Vernon Bell, Yoseikan karate, and 10th dan ju-jutsu, introduced karate to Great Britain (1922–2004).

Bibliography 
Henry Plée is the author of hundreds of articles and reviews, and has held numerous conferences for 60 years. He has written books under the names Henry Plée, Henry Plee, Henri Plée, Henri Plee, Henry-Désiré Plée, H.D. Plee or H.D. Plée, which are known as the quintessence of the original Martial Arts and strongly focused on the awakening of the Human Being.

His books are:

 The sublime and ultimate art of vital points / L'Art sublime et ultime des points vitaux (in French), published in 2004.
 Martial chronicles / Chroniques martiales (in French), published in 2002.
 The sublime and ultimate art of vital points / L'arte sublime ed estrema dei punti vitali (in Italian), published in 1999.
 The sublime and ultimate art of vital points: kyûshô, vital points, dim mak, killing touches, dim hsueh, poison touches / L'Art sublime et ultime des points vitaux: kyûshô, points vitaux, dim mak, touches mortelles, dim hsueh, touches poison (in French), published in 1998.
 The sublime and ultimate art of vital points: kyûshô, vital points, dim mak, killing touches, dim hsueh, poison touches / El arte sublime y ultimo de los puntos vitales: kyûshô, puntos vitales, dim mak, toques mortales, dim hsueh, toques veneno (in Spanish), published in 1998.
 Aikido up to 1st dan in image / L'aikido jusqu'à la ceinture noire 1er dan par l'image (in French), published in 1975.
 Official basic Karate Katas: Shotokan, published in 1973.
 The secret vital points of the human body / Les points vitaux secrets du corps humain (in French), published in 1972.
 Karate: Beginner to Black Belt, published in 1967.
 Karate in pictures / Karaté par l'image (in French), published in 1962.
 Karate by pictures: the science of self-defence by the empty hand lucidly explained and illustrated, published in 1962.
 ABC of karate-do / ABC du karate-do (in French), published in 1957.
 Conquer or die, the spirit and technics of karate-do: by H.D. Plee / Vaincre ou mourir, l'esprit et la technique du Karaté-Do: par H. D. Plée (in French), published in 1955.
 Official international Judo directory / Annuaire officiel de Judo international (in French), published in 1950.
 Judo international (in French), published in 1948.
 Judo Kodokan and Budo Magazine (in French and English), published from 1950 to 1973.

References

External links
 Henry Plee non-official website

1923 births
2014 deaths
Martial arts writers
French aikidoka
French male judoka
French jujutsuka
French male karateka
French kendoka
Karate coaches
Martial arts school founders
French male non-fiction writers
20th-century philanthropists